Jamie McGhee (born 28 September 1989) is an English footballer and now player/manager of Harrowby United. 

McGhee is a graduate of the Mansfield Town youth academy, and made his first-team debut for the Stags near the end of the 2006-07 season, appearing as a substitute in the League Two games against Swindon and Bury. He did not feature for Mansfield's first-team in 2007-08, and appeared only once during the 2008-09 season (against York City in the Conference League Cup). He was released by Mansfield at the end of the season, and signed for Corby Town in July 2009.

External links

1989 births
Living people
English footballers
English Football League players
Mansfield Town F.C. players
Corby Town F.C. players
Grantham Town F.C. players
Boston United F.C. players
Northern Premier League players
Association football midfielders